Al Rawda Palace is a palace in western Bahrain. The Palace lies north by road from Al-Sakhir Palace and just east of Madinat Hamad in Ar-Rifa.

Palaces in Bahrain